Light-Athletic Football Complex CSKA or Football Manege CSKA is a multi-use covered stadium in Moscow, Russia. Complex is part of the CSKA Sports Complex and is its major feature that was prepared to the 1980 Summer Olympics.

It is used as an alternative stadium of PFC CSKA Moscow. The capacity of the stadium was 4,000 spectators. Due to limitation of seating capacity PFC CSKA Moscow plays elsewhere and plans to move to its own new stadium in 2016.

The complex is utilized by gymnasts.

See also
 Khodynka Aerodrome, the first Moscow Central Airport, initial home of the State Flight Testing Center of Ministry of Defense
 Megasport Arena is located in a close vicinity

External links
 Information about the stadium
 Sports grounds of CSKA Moscow. CSKA Moscow website.

Sports venues in Moscow
Sports venues built in the Soviet Union
Football venues in Russia
Venues of the 1980 Summer Olympics
Olympic modern pentathlon venues
Olympic fencing venues
CSKA Moscow
Olympic wrestling venues
Sports venues completed in 1979
1979 establishments in Russia
Indoor arenas in Russia